Rich Grove Township is one of twelve townships in Pulaski County, Indiana, United States. As of the 2010 census, its population was 921 and it contained 354 housing units.

Rich Grove Township was organized in 1854.

Geography

Unincorporated towns
 Denham at 
(This list is based on USGS data and may include former settlements.)

Adjacent townships
 Wayne Township, Starke County (north)
 California Township, Starke County (northeast)
 Franklin Township (east)
 Monroe Township (southeast)
 Jefferson Township (south)
 White Post Township (southwest)
 Cass Township (west)
 Railroad Township, Starke County (northwest)

Major highways
  Indiana State Road 39

Education
 North Judson-San Pierre School Corporation

Rich Grove Township residents may obtain a free library card from the Pulaski County Public Library in Winamac.

Political districts
 Indiana's 2nd congressional district
 State House District 20
 State Senate District 5

References
 United States Census Bureau 2008 TIGER/Line Shapefiles
 United States Board on Geographic Names (GNIS)
 IndianaMap

External links
 Indiana Township Association
 United Township Association of Indiana

Townships in Pulaski County, Indiana
Townships in Indiana